John Stearne may refer to:

John Stearne (physician), Irish physician and educator
John Stearne (witch-hunter), English witch-hunter
John Sterne (bishop of Dromore) (1660–1745), also called John Stearne, Bishop of Dromore from 1713 until 1717, and then Bishop of Clogher

See also
John Sterne (disambiguation)
Stern John, Trinidadian football manager and footballer
John Stearns (disambiguation)